Kaya FM 95.9 is a commercial radio station that broadcasts from Johannesburg, Gauteng, South Africa.

History
Kaya FM was launched in August 1997, and was one of the first frequencies to be approved for private commercial radio in South Africa. The station format is 60% music and 40% talk, thus making it unique to other ICASA approved licences.

Format and listeners
According to its website, the current listenership stands at 628 000 per average day. Most of the target audience of KAYA FM resides in the urban areas. The music format offers a mix including Adult Contemporary music and Rhythm and Blues, Soul, and Contemporary Jazz. It also includes African Indigenous Genre to its sound. Kaya FM 95.9 programming contains news, sport, and topical driven issues as well.

Footprint
Greater Johannesburg Metropolis
Northern Boundary: Pretoria Boundary
Eastern Boundary: Springs
Southern Boundary: Vanderbijlpark
Western Boundary: Carletonville

Broadcast time
24/7

Listener figures

References

External links
 Kaya FM 95.9 Website

Radio stations in Johannesburg
Radio stations established in 1997